Depot Creek is a river in Nipissing District in Northeastern Ontario, Canada. It is in the Saint Lawrence River drainage basin and is a tributary of Lake Nosbonsing.

The creek begins at an unnamed lake in geographic Boulter Township and flows southeast to Guilmette Lake, then turns west to Sobie Lake. The river heads northwest into the municipality of Chisholm, continues northwest into the municipality of East Ferris, and reaches its mouth at Lake Nosbonsing. Lake Nosbonsing flows via the Kaibuskong River, the Mattawa River and the Ottawa River to the Saint Lawrence River.

See also
List of rivers of Ontario

References

Sources

Rivers of Nipissing District